The Informant247 is an independent online newspaper based in Kwara State, Nigeria. Launched in August 2017.
The Informant247 newspaper is characterised by covering political news across Nigeria.

Offerings 
In January 2022, the medium launched its foundation, The Informant247 Foundation, aimed to enable undergraduate students with passion for journalism develop their skills and improve their performance in the field of communication and media industry.

The medium organises an essay competition to test the creative writing abilities of undergraduates and encourage campus journalism in Nigeria. In a campaign to combat the increasing spread of fake news in the country, the Kwara-based online newspaper launched a fact-checking platform.

References 

2017 establishments in Nigeria
Daily newspapers published in Nigeria
Internet properties established in 2017
Newspapers established in 2017
Online newspapers published in Nigeria
Weekly newspapers published in Nigeria